Our Beloved Summer is a South Korean romantic comedy television series. Billed as "Studio N's first original series", it is directed by Kim Yoon-jin with screenplay by Lee Na-eun, starring Choi Woo-shik, Kim Da-mi, Kim Sung-cheol, and Roh Jeong-eui. The series is a coming-of-age story about a former couple who are forced to come together again when a documentary they shot in high school goes viral. It premiered on SBS TV on December 6, 2021, and aired on Mondays and Tuesdays at 22:00 (KST) till January 25, 2022. It is available for streaming on Netflix.

Synopsis
A coming-of-age romantic comedy that revolves around Choi Ung (Choi Woo-shik) and Kook Yeon-soo (Kim Da-mi), ex-lovers who broke up with a promise to never meet again. As luck would have it, the documentary they filmed ten years ago in high school went viral and they are forced to face the cameras together again by their producer friend. The series depicts their complicated feelings and growth.

This drama shows what love feels like. Instead of discussing practical issues like family conflicts, it tells a story about throb, memory and dream. Romance is revealed in many small, unnoticed acts.

Cast

Main
Choi Woo-shik as Choi Ung, 29 years old
 Song Ha-hyun as young Choi Ung
A free-spirited building illustrator who goes by the pseudonym "Go-oh". In high school, he was the last ranked student in the school.
Kim Da-mi as Kook Yeon-soo, 29 years old
A realistic PR expert. She is fiercely independent and is the type to not bother others about her feelings. She was the 1st ranked student in high school.
 Kim Sung-cheol as Kim Ji-ung, 29 years old
 Kim Ji-hoon as young Kim Ji-ung
Choi Ung's best friend and a PD in charge of producing the documentary. He has a crush on Kook Yeon-Soo since high school.
 Roh Jeong-eui as NJ, 25 years old
A top idol who develops a friendship with Choi Ung and has a secret crush on him.

Supporting

People around Choi Ung

 Ahn Dong-goo as Gu Eun-ho, 27 years old
Choi Ung's manager and friend.
 Park Won-sang as Choi Ho, 56 years old
Choi Ung's father.
 Seo Jeong-yeon as Lee Yeon-ok, 53 years old
Choi Ung's mother.
 Jung Kang-Hee as Chang-sik
The owner of a hardware store and a neighborhood friend of Choi Ung's father.

People around Kook Yeon-soo
 Park Jin-joo as Lee Sol-yi, 30 years old
Kook Yeon-soo's best friend. She is a former writer and now owns a bar.
 Cha Mi-kyung as Kang Ja-kyung, 75 years old
Kook Yeon-soo's grandma.

People around Kim Ji-ung 
 Jo Bok-rae as Park Dong-il, 39 years old
The team leader of the documentary production company. Ji-ung's direct senior and the PD of the original documentary.
 Jeon Hye-won as Jeong Chae-ran, 27 years old
Kim Ji-ung's junior and his closest colleague.
 Lee Seung-woo as Lim Tae-hoon, 27 years old
New PD who recently joined the broadcasting station. He is Kim Ji-ung's junior and an enthusiastic person.
 Lee Seon-hee as Lee Min-kyung
A documentary writer who joins Kim Ji-ung's team.

People around NJ
 Park Do-wook as Chi-seong, 33 years old
 NJ's manager.
 Ahn Soo-bin as Ahn Mi-yeon, 31 years old
NJ's stylist.

RUN Company people
Heo Jun-seok as Bang Yi-hoon, 40 years old
 RUN Company's president.
 Park Yeon-woo as Kim Myung-ho, 28 years old
Planning team member.
 Yoon Sang-jeong as Ji Ye-in, 27 years old
Planning team member who sincerely respects Yeon-soo. She is knowledgeable and witty.
 Cha Seung-yeop as Kang Ji-woon, 26 years old
Planning team intern.

Special appearance 
 Lee Joon-hyuk as Jang Do-yoon
One of Yeon-soo's clients.
 Kwak Dong-yeon as Artist Nu-ah
 Kang Ki-doong as Jin-seop, Lee Sol-yi's ex-boyfriend.
 Park Mi-hyun as Kim Ji-ung's mother

Production
The series reunites Choi Woo-shik and Kim Da-mi, who worked together in the 2018 mystery action film The Witch: Part 1. The Subversion. It also marks Studio N's first original drama.

Casting
In March 2021, Choi Woo-shik and Kim Da-mi were confirmed for the series. The rest of the lineup was confirmed on July 8.

Filming
Filming began in early July 2021.

Release
Our Beloved Summer premiered on SBS TV on December 6, 2021, and aired on Mondays and Tuesdays at 22:00 (KST). It is also available for streaming on Netflix.

Adaptation
A webtoon based on Our Beloved Summer is under production. The webtoon is a prequel that depicts the high school days of the two main characters of the TV series (Choi Ung and Kook Yeon-soo) and was released on Naver Webtoon in 2021.

Original soundtrack

Part 1

Part 2

Part 3

Part 4

Part 5

Part 6

Part 7

Part 8

Part 9

Part 10

Part 11

Chart performance

Viewership

Awards and nominations

References

External links
  
 
  Our Beloved Summer at Naver 
 Our Beloved Summer at Daum 
 
 

Seoul Broadcasting System television dramas
2021 South Korean television series debuts
2022 South Korean television series endings
South Korean comedy-drama television series
Television series by Studio S
Television series by Studio N (Naver)
Korean-language Netflix exclusive international distribution programming